Solstice are a neo-progressive, folk rock band formed in 1980 in Milton Keynes, England. They are led by guitarist Andy Glass, who is the sole founding member still in the band.

History
The band formed in 1980, and performed BBC sessions and received national music press coverage before splitting in 1985 (with one guest appearance in 1986). Their only album release in this period was 1984's Silent Dance.

Interest generated by a CD reissue of Silent Dance led to a reunion in the nineties with two studio releases, New Life and Circles, and a live album, The Cropredy Set.

Guitarist Andy Glass once more put the band on hold in order to focus on band 3sticks. A DVD release of the Cropredy performance preceded another reunion in 2007, with the entire back catalogue being remastered and issued in expanded "Definitive Edition" form. The band then toured the UK and, for the first time, mainland Europe. In Spring 2022, Solstice underook an extensive tour of the UK and mainland Europe in support of the Sia album. They also previewed a track from their then-to-be-released seventh studio album. Anyone pledging to pre-order the as yet unnamed album also received a free download of "Solstice Live at MK11" - a digital only live album recorded at the Crauford Arms in Wolverton, Bucks, UK on two nights in September 2021.

Band members Andy Glass, Peter Helmsley, and Jenny Newman also work together in the band "3 Sticks".

Members

Current
Andy Glass - guitars
Jess Holland - vocals
Peter Helmsley - drums
Steve McDaniels - keyboards
Jenny Newman - violin
Robin Phillips - bass

Former
Emma Brown - vocals
Ken Bowley - bass
Clive Bunker - drums
Barbara Deason - vocals
Marc Elton - violin, keyboards
Mark Hawkins - bass
Heidi Kemp - vocals
Sandy Leigh - vocals
Shelley Patt - vocals
Sue Robinson - vocals
Craig Sunderland - bass
Martin Wright - drums

Discography

Studio albums
Silent Dance (1984)
New Life (1993)
Circles (1997)
Spirit (2010)
Prophecy (2013)
Sia (released 23rd November 2020)

Live albums
The Cropredy Set (2002)
Kindred Spirits (2011)
Live in Veruno (2022)

Compilation albums
Pathways (1998)

References

English progressive rock groups
Musical groups established in 1980
1980 establishments in England